Omar Kareem Naber (born 7 July 1981) is a Slovenian singer, songwriter and guitar player. He first represented Slovenia at the Eurovision Song Contest 2005 in Kyiv with the song "Stop" and for a second time at the Eurovision Song Contest 2017 in Kyiv with the song "On My Way", but failed to qualify to the final on both occasions.

Early life 

Naber was born on 7 July 1981 in Ljubljana, SR Slovenia, then still part of the Socialist Federal Republic of Yugoslavia. His father, Samir Naber originates from Jordan, and is a dentist by profession working in Ljubljana. His mother, Alenka Naber, is a Slovenian and works as a piano teacher. Like his parents, he was raised Christian. He finished high school diploma as a dental technician and even did six months internship, but soon realized that this is not what he really wants to do in his life. He is actively involved in music since the age of 16, when he joined Veter (Wind), a mixed choir of Ljubljana high schools. The main inspiration for him becoming a musician was because of Green Day.

Career

1999–2001: Early years 
In 1999 he founded a rock band, with some member changes over the years, but the band is still playing today. He had over 800 gigs with his band in total and another hundred at charity events. 

In 2001 he took second place at the local song contest ‘Kdo bo osvojil Triglav’ (who will come on the top of Triglav) and immediately signed a contract with Slovenian label Nika Records.

After he signed a contract he performed as back vocalist for various Slovenian artists in studio sessions and live performances. He appeared in different albums for D.D.V., for Saša Vrtnar (‘Persona Non Grata’), for Rok'n'band (‘Elvis je živ’) etc.

2004: Battle of the talents 
In late 2004 Naber won Bitka talentov, the Slovenian version of the Battle of the talents and became nationwide recognized. This year he also recorded his first song and video "Vse kar si želiš" (Anything you want), released as single and on his Omar album next year.

2005: First Eurovision performance 
As a winner of this battle, he performed and won at the EMA 2005 Slovenian national entry for Eurovision. He participated in the Eurovision Song Contest 2005 with song "Stop" (in Slovene), a song he had composed himself. He failed to qualify to the final however, finishing in 12th place with 69 points. 

His first album Omar was also released in 2005. He spent 2006 touring Slovenia, as well as internationally, and eventually went back to the studio to record his second album with his band Kareem. This second album, named Kareem, was released in 2007.

In 2011, Naber was sentenced to serve seven months in prison for sexually assaulting a woman in a Ljubljana club.

2014: Third album 

In 2014, he first released his third album Na glavo in Slovenia, along with its English version No Helmet a couple of months later in England.

2017: Second Eurovision performance 

He won the latest national selection and became the second time the national representative for Slovenia in the Eurovision Song Contest 2017 with the song "On My Way". However again he failed to Qualify for the final finishing 17th (Second to last) with 36 points in the first semi-final.

Discography

Albums

Singles

Other Appearances

Failed Eurovision attempts 

He entered the national selection for Slovenia three more times and one more time for Switzerland, not proceeding to the main contest: 

  – Slovenian national entry with "I Still Carry On"
  – Slovenian national entry with "Bistvo skrito je očem"
  – Slovenian national entry with "I Won't Give Up" 
  – Swiss national entry with "Take Me Far"

References

External links 
Official website

1981 births
Living people
Musicians from Ljubljana
21st-century Slovenian male singers
Eurovision Song Contest entrants for Slovenia
Eurovision Song Contest entrants of 2005
Slovenian people of Jordanian descent
Eurovision Song Contest entrants of 2017
Slovenian pop singers
Slovenian rock singers